The 32nd Infantry Division (32-ya Pekhotnaya Diviziya) was an infantry formation of the Russian Imperial Army. It was part of the 11th Army Corps.

Organization
1st Brigade
125th Infantry Regiment Kursky
126th Infantry Regiment Rylsky
2nd Brigade
127th Infantry Regiment Putivlsky
128th Infantry Regiment Starooskolsky
32nd Artillery Brigade

Commanders
1896-1897: Georgy Tumanov

Chiefs of Staff
1891-1896: Nikolai Ruzsky
1896-1898: Alexander Ragoza

Commanders of the 1st Brigade
1873: M.F. Petrushevkiy
1916: Vladimir Cheremisov

Commanders of the 2nd Brigade
April 30 - June 30, 1878: Nikolay Dmitrievich Tatischev

Artillery Brigade Commanders
1911-1914: Mikhail Promtov

References

Infantry divisions of the Russian Empire
Military units and formations disestablished in 1918